The following people spent time at the University of Colombo as either teaching staff or students.

Heads of state and government
 J.R. Jayawardene - former President and Prime Minister of Sri Lanka
 Gotabaya Rajapaksa - former President of Sri Lanka
 Ranil Wickramasinghe - former President and Prime Minister of Sri Lanka

Prominent figures in the independence movement
 Dr Charles Alwis Hewavitharana, FRCS - leader in the independence movement

Legislators and political figures
 Hector Abhayavardhana - Trotskyist
Professor Ranjith Bandara, Member of Parliament in Sri Lanka
 A. Amirthalingam - former Opposition leader, Member of Parliament and Tamil separatist   
 Hon. Tissa Attanayake - former Cabinet Minister; former Member of Parliament
 Professor Sir Nicholas Attygalle, FRCS - former President of the Senate of Ceylon, Vice-Chancellor of University of Ceylon, Dean Faculty of Medicine & Professor of Obstetrics and Gynaecology 
 Hon. Ronnie De Mel, CCS  - former Cabinet Minister and Member of Parliament
 Hon. William de Silva - former Cabinet Minister and Member of Parliament
 Deshamanya Neville Kanakeratne - former Governor of the Southern Province
 Hon. Anil Moonesinghe  - former Cabinet Minister and Member of Parliament
 Senator Somasundaram Nadesan - former Senator
 Hon. Professor G. L. Peiris  - former Cabinet Minister and Member of Parliament
 Hon. M. Sivasithamparam - former Deputy Speaker of Parliament
 Hon. Doctor Tissa Vitharana - current Cabinet Minister of Science and Technology and Member of Parliament
 Hon. Doctor  Nissanka Wijeyeratne, CCS - former Cabinet Minister of Education, Higher Education and  Justice; Member of Parliament; Sri Lankan Ambassador to the Russian Federation; former Permanent Secretary; Diyawadana Nilame of the Temple of the Tooth

Clergy and religious figures
 Cardinal Thomas Cooray, OMI - former Archbishop of Colombo; first Cardinal from Sri Lanka
Rt.Revd. Dr. Lakshman Wickremasinghe - Bishop of Kurunegala; youngest bishop in the Church of England

Civil servants
 Hamilton Shirley Amerasinghe, CCS - former Permanent Secretary of the Ministry of Finance & Treasury, Ministry of Health (also listed in Diplomats)
 Deshamanya C.A. Coorey, SLAS -  former Permanent Secretary of the Ministry of Finance & Treasury
 Deshamanya Dr Gamani Corea - former Secretary-General of the UNCTD (1974–1984); Permanent Secretary of the Ministry of Planning and Economic Affairs; Senior Deputy Governor of the Central Bank of Ceylon
 Tissa Devendra - former Chairman of Public Service Commission; Chairman of Salaries Commission; first President of the Colombo University Alumni Association
 Hemasiri Fernando - former Secretary to the Prime Minister
 Bernard Peiris, OBE, JP - former Cabinet Secretary
 M. J. Perera, CCS - first Chairman of the Rupavahini Corporation; former Permanent Secretary of the Education and Cultural Affairs Ministry; Vice-Chancellor of University of Peradeniya
 G.V.P. Samarasinghe, CCS - former Cabinet Secretary and Permanent Secretary of Defence and Foreign Affairs
 S.J. Walpita, CCS - former Permanent Secretary to the Ministry of Industries & Fisheries; Vice-Chancellor of University of Ceylon,  Peradeniya 
Bradman Weerakoon, CCS - former Secretary to the Prime Minister

Diplomats
 T. D. S. A. Dissanayake  - former Sri Lankan Ambassador to Indonesia and Egypt
 Yogendra Duraiswamy, SLOS - former Sri Lankan diplomat
 Deshamanya Dr Vernon Mendis, SLOS - former United Nations' Special Envoy to the Middle East, Sri Lankan High Commissioner to the United Kingdom, Canada; Ambassador to USSR, Cuba and Secretary General of the Non Aligned Movement
 Daya Perera, PC - former Sri Lankan High Commissioner to Canada; Ambassador to the United Nations in New York
 Wickrema Weerasooria  - former Sri Lankan High Commissioner to Australia and New Zealand; Permanent Secretary to the Ministry of Plan Implementation

Military
 General Deshamanya Sepala Attygalle, MVO, idc, psc, SLAC  - former Commander of the Sri Lankan Army (1967–1977) and Permanent Secretary to the Ministry of Defence
 Major General Anton Muttukumaru - first Ceylonese Army officer to serve as Commander of the Ceylon Army
 Major General Dr. Chelliah Thurairaja, USP, SLMC - former Director Army Medical Services and Colonel Commandant of the Sri Lanka Army Medical Corps

Police
 Sydney de Zoysa - former Deputy Inspector General of Police, Range II; Permanent Secretary to the Ministry of Internal Security; a leader of the attempted military coup in 1962
 C. C. Dissanayake - former Senior Deputy Inspector General of Police (SDIG) and a leader of the attempted military coup in 1962
 S.A. Dissanayake - former Inspector General of Police (IGP) and Additional Permanent Secretary of the Ministry of External Affairs and Defence
 N. K. Illangakoon - current Inspector General of Police (IGP)

Academics

Vice Chancellors
 Professor Savitri Goonesekere - former Vice Chancellor of the University of Colombo
 Professor Kshanika Hirimburegama - current Vice Chancellor of the University of Colombo
 Professor Vidya Jyothi V. K. Samaranayake - former Dean of the Faculty of Science, University of Colombo and founder of University of Colombo School of Computing
 Professor Stanley Wijesundera - former Vice Chancellor of the University of Colombo

Professors and scholars
 Professor Hithanadura Janaka De Silva - Foundation Professor of Medicine, University of Kelaniya; Dean of Faculty of Medicine Kelaniya (Student Faculty of Medicine 1977-1982)
 Professor Nalin de Silva - professor in the Department of Mathematics at the University of Kelaniya 
 Dr Nirmal Ranjith Dewasiri - historian and Head of the Department of History, University of Colombo
 Professor Deshamanya J B Disanayake - professor and former Head of the Department of Sinhala, University of Colombo 
 Professor Devaka Fernando - Foundation Professor of Medicine, University of Sri Jayawardanapura; Visiting Professor of Endocrinology University of Newcastle upon Tyne, University of Sheffield; Honorary Professor Sheffield Hallam University (Student Faculty of Medicine 1976-1981 and Senior Lecturer in Medicine 1994-1996) 
 Dr. Brendon Gooneratne - Head and Senior Lecturer, Department of Parasitology, University of Ceylon, Peradeniya
 Professor Yasmine Gooneratne - poet, short story writer and essayist
 Professor Shan Ratnam - Head of the Department of Obstetrics and Gynaecology, National University Hospital of Singapore
 Professor A. Suri Ratnapala - Professor of Law, T.C. Beirne School of Law, University of Queensland
 Professor Ediriweera Sarachchandra - playwright, novelist and poet
 Professor K. N. Seneviratne - Professor of Medicine; founder director of Sri Lanka's Postgraduate Institute of Medicine 
 Professor Jayadeva Uyangoda - professor and former Head of the Department of Political Science, University of Colombo
 Dr Maitree Wickramasinghe - academic and senior lecturer at the Department of English of the University of Kelaniya
 Professor Nira Wickramasinghe - historian and Professor of Modern South Asian Studies at Leiden University in the Netherlands 
 Dr Gihan Wikramanayake - Head and Senior Lecturer, Department of Information Systems Engineering of the University of Colombo School of Computing

Artists

Novelists, poets and playwrights
Professor Ediriweera Sarachchandra - Sri Lanka's premier playwright

Actors
 Jackson Anthony - actor, director, singer 
 Iranganie Serasinghe - actress

Visual artists
 Malaka Dewapriya - filmmaker, short film director, video artist, radio play writer

Judges
 Hon. Justice Saleem Marsoof - former Judge of the  Supreme Court
 Hon. Justice Neville Samarakoon - former Chief Justice of Sri Lanka
 Sri Lankabhimanya Hon. Justice Christopher Weeramantry - former Judge of the International Court of Justice and the Supreme Court of Sri Lanka

Medicine 
 Professor Hithanadura Janaka De Silva - Foundation Professor of Medicine University of Kelaniya, Dean Faculty of Medicine Kelaniya
 Professor Devaka Fernando - Foundation Professor of Medicine University of Sri Jayawardanapura; Visiting Professor of Endocrinology, University of Newcastle upon Tyne, University of Sheffield; Honorary Professor, Sheffield Hallam University
Dr Brendon Gooneratne - scholar and author
Dr Charles Alwis Hewavitharana - independence activist
Dr Richard Lionel Spittel, CMG, CBE - naturalist and author

Journalists
 Eva Ranaweera - feminist editor, poet and novelist
Regi Siriwardena - journalist and writer

Sportsmen
 Brigadier Dr. H.I.K. Fernando - former Ceylon cricketer
 Lasantha Fernando - tennis champion and Davis Cup player
 Jehan Mubarak - cricketer
 Tambyah Murugaser - former Vice President of the Board of Control for Cricket; Sri Lanka team manager
 Dr Ajith C. S. Perera - former test-match-panel senior cricket umpire; disability activist
 Mano Ponniah - former Ceylon cricketer and member of the Cambridge eleven
 Kumar Sangakkara - captain of the Sri Lankan national cricket team

Lawyers 
T.B. Dissanayake - former Commissioner of Assize
Palitha Fernando, PC - current Attorney General of Sri Lanka and Judge Advocate of the Sri Lanka Navy

Engineers 
B.D Rampala - former Chief Mechanical Engineer and  General Manager of the  Ceylon Government Railway

Activists
 Rajini Thiranagama - human rights activist and feminist

Faculty 
 Professor Sir Nicholas Attygalle
 Professor Sir Charles Irwin Ball
 Professor Nalin de Silva
Dr Nirmal Ranjith Dewasiri
 Professor Deshamanya J B Disanayake
 Professor J B Disanayake
 Professor Christie Jayaratnam Eliezer, AM
 Professor Savitri Goonesekere
 Professor Kshanika Hirimburegama
 Professor Kumari Jayawardena
 Professor Amal Jayawardane
 Professor Sir William Ivor Jennings
 Professor Kusuma Karunaratne
 Professor Sarath Kotagama
 Professor S.R. Kottegoda
 Professor Gunapala Piyasena Malalasekera
 Professor Dharmasena Pathiraja
 Professor G. L. Peiris
 Professor Vidya Jyothi V. K. Samaranayake
 Professor Ediriweera Sarachchandra
 Professor Anuradha Seneviratna
 Professor K. N. Seneviratne
 Professor Priyani Soysa
 Hedi Stadlen
 Professor Deepika Udagama
 Professor Jayadeva Uyangoda
 Professor Nira Wickramasinghe
 Professor Stanley Wijesundera

References

Colombo
Colombo
University